Peter Yagmoor (born 20 October 1993) is a former Australian rules football player.

Early Life
Yagmoor was born and raised in Cairns, his Lebanese and Indigenous Australian father moved there from Melbourne where he met his mother. He played his junior football with Cairns City Cobras and North Cairns in the AFL Cairns competition before moving to Brisbane where he played with the Kenmore Bears before playing senior football with Morningside in the Queensland Australian Football League.

AFL Career
Yagmoor made his debut in round 1, against . He managed two tackles but did not gather a single disposal. He was dropped but earned a recall against Brisbane Lions in round 7, where he gathered 11 disposals but was dropped again the next week.

Yagmoor was delisted by Collingwood at the end of the 2014 season, having played two senior games for the club.

References

External links

1993 births
Living people
Collingwood Football Club players
Indigenous Australian players of Australian rules football
Australian rules footballers from Queensland
Morningside Australian Football Club players